The Rhode Island Rams football program is the intercollegiate American football team for the University of Rhode Island located in the U.S. state of Rhode Island. The team competes in the NCAA Division I Football Championship Subdivision (FCS) and are members of the Colonial Athletic Association (CAA). Rhode Island's first football team was fielded in 1895. The team plays its home games at the 6,555 seat Meade Stadium in Kingston, Rhode Island.

Conference affiliations 

Rhode Island has played as both an independent and conference-affiliated team.
 Independent / Athletic League of New England State Colleges (1895–1946)
 Yankee Conference (1947–1996)
 Atlantic 10 Conference (1997–2006)
 Colonial Athletic Association (2007–present)

Playoffs
The Rams have appeared in the Division I-AA/FCS Playoffs three times, but not since 1985. They have just four winning seasons since that time, with 2018 being the first since 2002. Their combined record is 2–3.

Championships

Conference championships 
The Rams have won seven conference championships, all of which were won during their tenure in the Yankee Conference, highlighted by two separate runs of numerous championships (four in five years during the 1950s and three in four years during the 1980s) and respective droughts between those runs, with a 24-year drought between titles in 1957 and 1981 and an ongoing drought since Rhode Island's last title in 1985 of over 30 years.

Divisional championships
The Rams have won one division title, in 1995: the Yankee Conference's New England Division.

Rivalries

Brown

UConn

Notable former players

 Derek Cassidy
 Chy Davidson
 Frank Ferrara
 Andy Gresh
 Chris Hixson
 Pat Narduzzi
 Steve Furness

Current NFL players
As of February 7, 2023, there are no former Rhode Island Rams player listed on team rosters in the National Football League (NFL).

 Isaiah Coulter, wide receiver, Buffalo Bills

Future non-conference opponents 
Announced schedules as of December 9, 2022.

References

External links

 

 
American football teams established in 1895
1895 establishments in Rhode Island